The Breaking Point is a 1924 American silent mystery film directed by Herbert Brenon and written by Edfrid A. Bingham and Julie Herne. The film, based on the 1922 novel of the same name by Mary Roberts Rinehart, stars Nita Naldi, Patsy Ruth Miller, George Fawcett, Matt Moore, John Merkyl, Theodore von Eltz, and Edythe Chapman. The film was released on May 4, 1924, by Paramount Pictures.

Plot
As described in a film magazine review, believing that he has killed the husband of Beverly Carlysle, an actress with whom he is infatuated, Judson Clark flees from the darkness of a ranch house in a western town into a snowstorm, is taken ill, and loses his memory. As Richard Livingstone, physician, he succeeds in New York City and becomes engaged to Elizabeth Wheeler. Ten years later while at a theater show, he is recognized from the stage by Beverly, who had thought her husband's killer had perished in the snow. He is taken to face justice back in Wyoming. There the real culprit confesses to the killing of Beverly's spouse. Judson finds happiness with Elizabeth.

Cast

Preservation
A complete copy of The Breaking Point is preserved in the Library of Congress collection.

References

External links

1924 films
American mystery films
1924 mystery films
Paramount Pictures films
Films directed by Herbert Brenon
American black-and-white films
1920s rediscovered films
American silent feature films
Films based on works by Mary Roberts Rinehart
Rediscovered American films
1920s English-language films
1920s American films
Silent mystery films